San Fernando Canton is a canton of Ecuador, located in the Azuay Province.  Its capital is the town of San Fernando.  Its population at the 2001 census was 3,961.

References
Ethnic groups as the Ecuadorian census of 2010:
Mestizo  96.6%
Afro-Ecuadorian  1.9%
White  1.3%
Indigenous  0.2%
Montubio  0.0%
Other  0.0%

References

Cantons of Azuay Province